The Vella Lavella white-eye, belted white-eye, or banded white-eye (Zosterops vellalavella) is a species of bird in the family Zosteropidae. It is endemic to the Solomon Islands.

Its natural habitat is subtropical or tropical moist lowland forests. It is threatened by habitat loss.

References

Vella Lavella white-eye
Birds of the Western Province (Solomon Islands)
Vella Lavella white-eye
Taxonomy articles created by Polbot